Qi Kerang was a general of the Chinese Tang Dynasty, who was part of Tang's resistance against the major agrarian rebel Huang Chao, as the military governor (Jiedushi) of Taining Circuit (泰寧, headquartered in modern Jining, Shandong).  After his failures against Huang, he returned to Taining, but in 886 was displaced in a surprise attack by Zhu Jin.

Resistance against Huang Chao 
Little is known about Qi Kerang's background, as he did not have a biography in either of the official histories of Tang Dynasty, the Old Book of Tang and the New Book of Tang.  As of 880, he was serving as the military governor of Taining Circuit, when then-reigning Emperor Xizong ordered the troops of several eastern circuits to be stationed at Yin River (溵水, a major branch of the Shaying River), and Qi Kerang's Taining troops to be stationed at Ru Prefecture (汝州, in modern Pingdingshan, Henan), to block off the northwestward advance by the major agrarian rebel Huang Chao.

In fall 880, Huang arrived in the region and, due to sheer numerical advantages (150,000 to 6,000), defeated Qi Kerang's colleague Cao Quanzhen the military governor of Tianping Circuit (天平, headquartered in modern Tai'an, Shandong). Further, around the same time, Xue Neng the military governor of Zhongwu Circuit (忠武, headquartered in modern Xuchang, Henan) was killed in a mutiny led by Zhou Ji. Qi, worried that Zhou would ambush him, abandoned his defensive position and returned to Taining's capital Yan Prefecture; following his lead, the other circuits' forces also abandoned their defensive position at Yin River, allowing Huang an open path toward the eastern capital Luoyang and the imperial capital Chang'an.

Qi soon regrouped and returned to the vicinity of Luoyang, but faced with Huang's growing strength, decided to withdraw to Tong Pass to defend it against Huang's further advance toward Chang'an.  At that time, he still had more than 10,000 soldiers, but his troops had no food supplies. When Emperor Xizong commissioned the imperial guard general Zhang Chengfan to reinforce Qi with a few thousand troops, Zhang objected on the basis that neither his troops nor Qi's troops had food supplies; Emperor Xizong sent Zhang on his way anyway, claiming that the food supplies would follow, but none did.

On January 4, 881, Zhang's relief troops arrived at Tong Pass, as did Huang's forward troops. Qi's troops and Huang's troops battled for most of the morning, and initially were able to fight off Huang's troops. However, around noontime, Qi's troops, in hunger, collapsed, and the soldiers trampled through Jinkeng, a valley full of thorns that served as part of the defensive perimeter for Tong Pass, destroying the thorns and therefore leaving Tong Pass open to attack. Qi fled, while Zhang continued to try to defend Tong Pass, but it fell, allowing Huang to continue on and capture Chang'an, forcing Emperor Xizong to flee to Chengdu.

Removal from Taining 
After his failure against Huang Chao, Qi Kerang appeared to have returned to Taining, for he was still referred to as the military governor of Taining in 885 (by which time Huang Chao had been defeated and Emperor Xizong had returned to Chang'an) when, as the result of a major dispute between the powerful eunuch Tian Lingzi and Wang Chongrong the military governor of Hezhong Circuit (河中, headquartered in modern Yuncheng, Shanxi), Tian tried to transfer Wang to Taining, Qi to Yiwu Circuit (義武, headquartered in modern Baoding, Hebei), and Wang Chucun the military governor of Yiwu to Hezhong. Wang Chucun defended Wang Chongrong in a petition, while Wang Chongrong gathered his troops and, along with his ally Li Keyong the military governor of Hedong Circuit (河東, headquartered in modern Taiyuan, Shanxi), defeated those of Tian and Tian's allies Zhu Mei the military governor of Jingnan Circuit (靜難, headquartered in modern Xianyang, Shaanxi) and Li Changfu the military governor of Fengxiang Circuit (鳳翔, headquartered in modern Baoji, Shaanxi). What position Qi took during the affair was unclear, but there was no record that he either refused to or tried to report to Yiwu.

In 886, Zhu Jin, an officer at Tianping and the cousin to Tianping's then-military governor Zhu Xuan, asked Qi to give his daughter in marriage to Zhu Jin.  Qi agreed, but did not know that this was actually part of Zhu Jin's plot to take over Taining. Zhu Jin led a procession from Tianping's capital Yun Prefecture to Yan Prefecture, and on his wagons hid weapons and armor. When he reached Yan Prefecture, on the day that he was supposed to receive the bride, he made a surprise attack, evicting Qi from Yan Prefecture.  He took over Taining Circuit and was eventually commissioned to be Taining's new military governor. That was the last historical reference to Qi, and it is not known what happened to him afterwards.

Notes and references 

 Zizhi Tongjian, vols. 253, 254, 256.

9th-century births
Year of death missing
Tang dynasty jiedushi of Taining Circuit
Tang dynasty jiedushi of Yiwu Circuit